Aframomum longipetiolatum is a monocotyledonous plant species in the family Zingiberaceae. It is native to Gabon.

References 

longipetiolatum
Flora of Gabon
Plants described in 1964